N. Hess' Sons was a Baltimore, Maryland area shoe store founded in 1872. Privately held, it was acquired from the founding family by a German company in the late 1970s.  At its peak in 1989 it had 32 stores, shrinking to 23 stores in 1994 in a conscious effort to achieve economies of scale after a bankruptcy and reorganization. At its demise in 1999 it had 11 stores throughout the Baltimore region.

Its Edmondson Village store (Hess Monkey Town) adjoined a children's barber shop which featured live monkeys.

The 1948 building that housed its flagship store on York Rd. is part of the Hochschild, Kohn Belvedere and Hess Shoes Historic district.

References 
 "After 127 years, Hess Shoes goes out of business", Baltimore Sun
 "Hess Shoes tries a bigger store for size", Baltimore Sun
 Footloose & Fancy A Personal History Of Hess Shoes (1972) by George B. Hess Sr
 Edmondson Village Shopping Center| Hunka Munka

Shoe companies of the United States
Companies based in Baltimore
American companies established in 1872
Retail companies established in 1872
Retail companies disestablished in 1999
1872 establishments in Maryland
1999 disestablishments in Maryland
Defunct companies based in Maryland